Garry Douglas Unger (born December 7, 1947) is a former professional ice hockey centre who played 16 seasons in the National Hockey League from 1967 until 1983.

Playing career 
Unger set an NHL record by playing 914 consecutive games in the regular season between February 24, 1968, and December 21, 1979, doing so with four teams: the Toronto Maple Leafs, Detroit Red Wings, St. Louis Blues and Atlanta Flames. Unger passed Andy Hebenton, who had the record of 630 consecutive games played that had stood since the 1963-64 NHL season.  Unger's streak came to an end after Flames' coach Al MacNeil benched him on December 21, 1979 (the only game he would miss that season). His record has since been surpassed by Phil Kessel who has played over 1000 consecutive games as of 2022

He was part of an six-player blockbuster transaction in which he was traded along with Frank Mahovlich and Pete Stemkowski from the Maple Leafs to the Red Wings for Norm Ullman, Paul Henderson and Floyd Smith on March 4, 1968. The Maple Leafs and Red Wings were in fifth and sixth place respectively at the bottom of the East Division standings at the time of the deal.

Unger finished his career with 1105 career NHL games, scoring 413 goals and 391 assists for 804 points, and he also registered 1075 career penalty minutes. Unger was the MVP of the 1974 NHL All-Star Game played in Chicago.  He had an assist and scored a shorthanded goal in the West Division's 6-4 victory over the East Division.

After retiring from the NHL he went to play for three seasons in the British professional league. During a season for the Peterborough Pirates he racked up 95 goals and well over 200 points while playing in only 30 games.

Personal 
Garry was the oldest of four children of Jakob and Olive (Wheeler) Unger. Unger's younger sister used a wheelchair; she proved to be an inspiration to Unger during his playing career. After being traded to Atlanta in 1979, Unger encountered a group of Christian players, including Paul Henderson, whom Unger credits with helping him discover spirituality and giving meaning to his life.

He and his wife Beverly have three children. Garry presently works with the Banff Hockey Academy in Banff, Alberta, Canada.

Career statistics

Regular season and playoffs

International

See also
List of NHL players with 1000 games played

References

External links

http://oldtimehockeyuk.com/gu1-wp - Garry Unger talks about his career in a podcast interview

1947 births
Living people
Atlanta Flames players
Canadian Christians
Canadian ice hockey centres
Canadian Mennonites
Canadian sports announcers
Detroit Red Wings players
Edmonton Oilers players
Ice hockey people from Calgary
London Nationals players
Los Angeles Kings players
Moncton Alpines (AHL) players
National Hockey League broadcasters
Rochester Americans players
St. Louis Blues players
Toronto Maple Leafs players
Edmonton Oilers announcers